On is the ninth studio album by Italian singer and songwriter Elisa, released on 25 March 2016 by Sugar Music. It was produced by Elisa and features collaborations with Jack Savoretti, Emma Marrone and Giuliano Sangiorgi.

Track listing
All tracks produced by Elisa.

Charts

Certifications

References

2016 albums
Elisa (Italian singer) albums
Italian-language albums